Shin Hyun-young (born 17 November 1980) is a South Korean doctor specialised in Family medicine currently serving as a Democratic member of National Assembly.

Background 
In 2020 election, Shin was on the top of the list for then-Platform Party's proportional representation. Her nomination was in strict contrast to the vice president of Korea Medical Association who joined the main opposition's sister party for its proportional representation list but resigned after he was placed as the number 22 of the list. After the election, her party merged with its sister party, Democratic Party. She is now its deputy floor leader.

She is widely known to the public as the co-author of the article which synthesises information related to the recovery of the third Covid-19 patient in Korea treated with AIDS medicine.

Before entering politics, she was an assistant professor of family medicine at Hanyang University and led family medicine department at Myongji Hospital. Moreover, Shin was director of multiple medical associations - Korean Association of Family Medicine, Association of Healthcare for Korean Unification, Korean Medical Women's Association, Korean Intern Resident Association and finally - and largest - Korea Medical Association (KMA). She was also KMA's spokesperson.

Shin holds three degrees in medicine - M.D. from Catholic University of Korea, a master's in Epidemiology from Yonsei University and a doctorate in medicine from Catholic Kwandong University. She graduated from one of the elite secondary education institutions in the country, Seoul Science High School.

Electoral history

References 

1980 births
Living people
People from Seoul
Yonsei University alumni
Catholic University of Korea alumni
South Korean general practitioners
Members of the National Assembly (South Korea)
Minjoo Party of Korea politicians
Female members of the National Assembly (South Korea)